Central is a census-designated place in north-central Washington County, Utah, United States.

Description
The population was 613 at the 2010 census. Central lies along State Route 18, on the edge of the Dixie National Forest, north of the city of St. George (the county seat of Washington County). Central has the ZIP code of 84722. Central is the starting place of the annual St. George Marathon.

Central was settled before 1910. It became an incorporated town in 1935, but was disincorporated in the 1960s. The town was so named because of its central location between Enterprise, and Veyo.

Demographics
As of the census of 2010, there were 613 people living in the CDP. There were 344 housing units. The racial makeup of the town was 96.1% White, 0.5% American Indian and Alaska Native, 0.8% Asian, 1.8% from some other race, and 0.8% from two or more races. Hispanic or Latino of any race were 3.6% of the population.

See also

 List of census-designated places in Utah

References

External links

Census-designated places in Washington County, Utah
Census-designated places in Utah
Populated places established in 1918
Former towns in Utah
Former populated places in Washington County, Utah